Xi Cheng Qing is a retired wushu taolu athlete from Macau. She is a triple medalist at the World Wushu Championships, she won the silver medal in women's changquan at the 2008 Beijing Wushu Tournament, and she is a double medalist at the East Asian Games and the Asian Wushu Championships.

References

External links 
 

Living people
Year of birth missing (living people)
Macau female wushu practitioners 
Competitors at the 2008 Beijing Wushu Tournament